JS Fuyuzuki (DD-118) is the fourth ship of Akizuki-class destroyers. She was commissioned on 13 March 2014.

Construction and career
Fuyuzuki was laid down at Mitsui Engineering & Shipbuilding Tamano Works on June 14, 2011 as the 2009 plan 5,000-ton type escort ship No. 2247 based on the medium-term defense capability development plan, and launched on August 22, 2012.

Commissioned on March 13, 2014, it was transferred to the 7th Escort Corps of the 3rd Escort Corps and deployed to Maizuru.

The construction cost of Fuyuzuki was about 72.6 billion yen, and since it was the first escort ship to be built in 17 years since JS Harusame at Mitsui Engineering & Shipbuilding, they called on retirees and Mitsubishi Heavy Industries workers to build and dress it up.

The predecessor destroyer Fuyutsuki was built at the Maizuru Naval Arsenal, and at the ceremony when he arrived at Maizuru, the captain said, Fuyuzuki has returned to Maizuru for the first time in 70 years.

Participated in the US-India joint maritime training (Malabar 2015) held in the waters east of India from September 26 to November 10, 2015.

Participated in the Australian Navy-sponsored multilateral maritime joint training in the waters around Darwin, Australia, from August 26 to October 18, 2016.

On October 11, 2016, the 3rd Escort Group was reorganized into the 3rd Escort Corps.

From February 26 to March 22, 2018, she was dispatched to Guam as a 2017 US training, and conducted offshore training in collaboration with the US Navy. From March 8 to March 14, we will participate in Multi-Sale 2018 and fight against air with the U.S. Navy missile cruiser USS Antietam, USS Curtis Wilbur, USS Benfold, and USS Mustin. Conducted anti-water warfare, anti-submarine warfare, shooting training, etc.

From June 8 to 16 of the same year, she participated in the Japan-US-India Joint Training (Malabar 2018) conducted on Guam Island and the sea and airspace around the island. In addition to Fuyuzuki, the participating units are the escort vessels JS Ise and JS Suzunami, five onboard aircraft, the submarine JS Sōryū, and two P-1 patrol aircraft.

In addition, from June 16 to 23, joint cruise training with the US Navy was conducted with JS Suzunami in the sea and airspace from around Guam to the south of Okinawa. From the US Navy, the aircraft carrier USS Ronald Reagan and several other ships participated.

From November 8 to 16 of the same year, joint cruise training was conducted with several ships including the US Navy aircraft carriers USS Ronald Reagan and USS John C. Stennis in the sea and airspace from the south of Shikoku to the area around Okinawa.

From October 24 to November 2, 2019, Japan-US joint training was conducted with the USS Ronald Reagan and several other ships in the sea and airspace from southern Okinawa to southern Kanto.

Gallery

References

 

2012 ships
Ships built by Mitsui Engineering and Shipbuilding
Akizuki-class destroyers (2010)